Luigi Sepe (born 8 May 1991) is an Italian professional footballer who plays as a goalkeeper for Serie A club Salernitana, on loan from Serie B club Parma.

Club career
Born in Torre del Greco, the Province of Naples, Sepe made his debut for his hometown club in Serie A on 28 January 2009, at age of 17, during the match against Fiorentina, lost 2–1. He replaced  Gianello in the 32nd minute. He wore the number 44 jersey during the 2008–09 season. He was the fourth keeper behind Gennaro Iezzo, Nicolás Navarro and Matteo Gianello.

In 2010–11 season, he was named in 2010–11 UEFA Europa League as list B member (U21 youth product), which he was the fourth keeper behind Morgan De Sanctis, Iezzo and Gianello.

From 2011 to 2018, Sepe was loaned out to different italian teams such as Pisa, Virtus Lanciano, Empoli and Fiorentina.

On 10 July 2018, Sepe signed with Parma on loan until 30 June 2019. On 10 July 2019, the deal was made permanent.

On 24 January 2022, he joined Salernitana on loan with a conditional obligation to buy.

International career
Sepe started three out of four matches for the Italy U18 team at the U18 Slovakia International Cup, ahead if Valerio Frasca in April 2009. Sepe made successive appearances with the Italy U19 team (born 1991 or later) from March to September in 2009. In both appearances, he replaced Simone Colombi for the second half, including versus Ukraine (born 1990 or later team). He was the reserve keeper for Colombi at the 2010 UEFA European Under-19 Football Championship qualification, and he also played once. After Italy qualified to the next round, he did not receive any call-ups again.

Personal life
In 2011, Sepe married Anna Laura Acampora, the niece of former footballer and now coach Carmine Gautieri. The couple has two children from the marriage, Giuseppe born in 2011 and Diego born in 2014.

Career statistics

Club

References

External links
 
 FIGC 

1991 births
Living people
Sportspeople from the Province of Naples
Association football goalkeepers
Italian footballers
Italy youth international footballers
Serie A players
Serie B players
Serie C players
S.S.C. Napoli players
S.S. Virtus Lanciano 1924 players
Pisa S.C. players
Empoli F.C. players
ACF Fiorentina players
Parma Calcio 1913 players
U.S. Salernitana 1919 players
Footballers from Campania